= Convention People's Party of Nigeria and the Cameroons =

Political party in Nigeria

The Convention People's Party of Nigeria and the Cameroons was a political party in Nigeria. Habib Raji Abdallah was the president of the party, and Osita C. Agwuna was the general secretary.

The party emerged from the People's Revolutionary Committee, a short-lived socialist formation that had been founded in mid-1951. The PRC had been dissolved in September 1951, as the organization passed through internal strife. The PRC was later replaced by the National Preparatory Committee, which in turn transformed itself into the Convention People's Party of Nigeria and the Cameroons.

The party tried to establish ties with the Convention People's Party in the Gold Coast, but were seemingly unsuccessful. The party disappeared soon thereafter.
